Pelistega is a genus of bacteria of the family Alcaligenaceae with one known species (Pelistega europaea).

References

Burkholderiales
Monotypic bacteria genera
Bacteria genera